Mario Bertini (born 7 January 1944) is an Italian former professional footballer who played as a defender and midfielder. Throughout his career Bertini played for Italian clubs Empoli, Fiorentina, Inter Milan, Prato, and Rimini; he spent nine seasons with Inter, winning a Serie A title in 1971. At international level, he represented the Italy national team on 25 occasions between 1966 and 1972, scoring twice, and was a member of the team that reached the 1970 FIFA World Cup Final.

Club career
During his Serie A club career, Bertini played for several Italian teams: Empoli (1963–64), Fiorentina (1964–68), and most notably Inter Milan (1968–77), where he remained for nine seasons, winning the Scudetto in 1971; he had previously also won a Coppa Italia and a Mitropa Cup double with Fiorentina in 1966. He also won the Serie C in 1963 whilst playing with Prato for a season (1962–63). He ended his career in Serie B, in 1978, after a season with Rimini (1977–78).

International career

Bertini earned 25 caps for the Italy national team between 1966 and 1972. He missed out on the 22-man Italy squad for the 1966 FIFA World Cup, although he was still brought to England by manager Edmondo Fabbri, along with Luigi Riva, as an additional reserve in order to gain experience with the national side. Bertini played in the 1970 FIFA World Cup, where he wore the number 10 shirt, as Italy managed a second-place finish. In the final, he marked Pelé in his movements in depth outside the area, although Brazil eventually defeated Italy 4–1.

Style of play
A quick, well-rounded, and hard-working defensive midfielder, Bertini was mainly known for his stamina, strength, and tackling abilities, and was also capable of playing as a defender due to his defensive attributes; although he primarily served as a ball-winner, he was a complete midfielder who was also known for his eye for goal from midfield, due to his powerful striking ability from distance, as well as his accuracy from penalties and ability to make later attacking runs from behind into the penalty area.

Honours
Fiorentina
Coppa Italia: 1965–66
Mitropa Cup: 1966

Inter Milan
Serie A: 1970–71

Prato
Serie C: 1962–63

References

1944 births
Living people
Italian footballers
Association football midfielders
Association football defenders
Italy international footballers
1970 FIFA World Cup players
Serie A players
Serie B players
Serie C players
A.C. Prato players
Empoli F.C. players
ACF Fiorentina players
Inter Milan players
Rimini F.C. 1912 players
People from Prato
Sportspeople from the Province of Prato
Footballers from Tuscany